Nuestra Belleza Baja California  Sur 2010, was held at the Balneario El Coromuel in La Paz, Baja California Sur on May 21, 2010. At the conclusion of the final night of competition, Karen Higuera of San Antonio was crowned the winner. Higuera was crowned by outgoing Nuestra Belleza Baja California Sur titleholder, Giovanna Martínez. Twelve contestants competed for the state title.

The pageant was hosted by Nuestra Belleza México 2007 Elisa Najera and René Strickler.

Results

Placements

Special awards

Judges
Jorge Suarez - Businessman
Carlos Antonio Rico - Producer
Patricio Borghetti - Actor & Singer
Ana Laura Corral - National Coordinator of Nuestra Belleza México

Background Music
Patricio Borghetti
Studio Jazz Monthiel Uribe
Academia de Danza Árabe Salam Alikon

Contestants

References

External links
Official Website

Baja California Sur, 2010
Nuestra Belleza, 2010
2010 in Mexico
May 2010 events in Mexico